The following lists events that happened during 1930 in South Africa.

Incumbents
 Monarch: King George V.
 Governor-General and High Commissioner for Southern Africa: 
 The Earl of Athlone (until 21 December).
 Jacob de Villiers (acting from 21 December).
 Prime Minister: James Barry Munnik Hertzog.
 Chief Justice: Jacob de Villiers.

Events
May
 19 – White women are enfranchised.

October
 10 – The Private Act of the University of Pretoria is passed, changing the name of the Transvaal University College to the University of Pretoria.

Births
 30 January – Magnus Malan, soldier and Minister of Defence in the 1980s, in Pretoria. (d. 2011)
 23 February – Fanie du Plessis, South African athlete, in Lichtenburg. (d. 2001)
 12 May – Mazisi Kunene, poet, anti-apartheid movement activist. (d. 2006)
 24 June – Donald Gordon, South African businessman and philanthropist (d. 2019)
 7 August – Felicia Kentridge, lawyer (d. 2015)
 5 November – Laloo Chiba, anti-apartheid activist. (d. 2020)
 12 November – Molly Blackburn, anti-apartheid movement activist (d. 1985)
 29 November – David Goldblatt, photographer, in Randfontein. (d. 2018)

Deaths
 28 February – Sir Perceval Maitland Laurence, English classical scholar, South African judge and benefactor of the University of Cambridge. (b. 1854)
 10 September 10 – Aubrey Faulkner, cricketer. (b. 1881)

Railways

Railway lines opened

 14 April – Cape – Fort Knokke to Woltemade no. 1, .
 24 April – Free State – Parys to Vredefort, .
 14 May – Free State – Petrus Steyn to Lindley, .
 19 September – Natal – Empangeni to Nkwalini, .
 1 November – Cape – Koopmansfontein to Postmasburg, .
 6 November – South West Africa – Witvlei to Gobabis, .
 10 December – Cape – New England to Barkly East, .

Locomotives
 One Class 8X 2-8-0 locomotive is rebuilt to a 4-8-0 configuration and reclassified to the only member of Class 8R.
 Six redesigned wide-firebox Class 16DA 4-6-2 Pacific locomotives enter passenger train service.
 Fourteen Class 19B 4-8-2 Mountain type locomotives enter service.

References

History of South Africa